Joahnys Oscar Argilagos Perez (born 11 January 1997) is a Cuban professional boxer. As an amateur, he won a bronze medal at the 2016 Summer Olympics as well as winning a gold medal at both the 2015 and 2017 World Championships.

Argilagos took up boxing in 2007 at the age of 10. He is fighting at amateur level for the World Series of Boxing, under the auspices of the (amateur) International Boxing Association. He has won the 2013 AIBA Junior World Championships, the 2015 AMBC American Confederation Boxing Championships, and the 2015 AIBA World Boxing Championships in light flyweight. He also won a silver medal at the 2015 Pan American Games and a bronze at the 2016 Olympics.

Amateur career

Olympic result
Rio 2016
Round of 16: Defeated Galal Yafai (Great Britain) 2–1
Quarter-finals: Defeated Peter Mungai Warui (Kenya) 3–0
Semi-finals: Defeated by Yuberjen Martínez (Colombia) 2–1

World Championship results
Doha 2015
Round of 16: Defeated Samuel Carmona (Spain) 3–0
Quarter-finals: Defeated Brendan Irvine (Republic of Ireland) 3–0
Semi-finals: Defeated Dmytro Zamotayev (Ukraine) 3–0
Final: Defeated Vasilii Egorov (Russia) 3–0

Hamburg 2017
Second round: Defeated Oscar Collazo (Puerto Rico) 3–2
Quarter-finals: Defeated Salah Ibrahim (Germany) 5–0
Semi-finals: Defeated Zhomart Yerzhan (Kazakhstan) 5–0
Final: Defeated Hasanboy Dusmatov (Uzbekistan) 3–2

Pan American Games result
Toronto 2015
Quarter-finals: Defeated Kevin Arias (Nicaragua) 2–0
Semi-finals: Defeated Yoel Finol (Venezuela) 2–1
Final: Defeated by Joselito Velázquez (Mexico) 3–0

Defection
In March 2018, Argilagos failed to appear at a weigh-in during a tournament in Tijuana. It was thought that Argilagos had defected from Cuba to become professional, following the likes of Luis Ortiz, Guillermo Rigondeaux and Yuriorkis Gamboa who had all previously defected from Cuba and later became professional.

Professional boxing record

References

External links
 
 

1997 births
Living people
Cuban male boxers
Olympic boxers of Cuba
Olympic bronze medalists for Cuba
Olympic medalists in boxing
Boxers at the 2016 Summer Olympics
Medalists at the 2016 Summer Olympics
Pan American Games medalists in boxing
Pan American Games silver medalists for Cuba
Boxers at the 2015 Pan American Games
AIBA World Boxing Championships medalists
World boxing champions
Light-flyweight boxers
Medalists at the 2015 Pan American Games